The 1958 Ladies Open Championships was held at the Lansdowne Club in London from 17–23 February 1958. Janet Morgan won her ninth consecutive title defeating Sheila Macintosh (née Speight) for the third successive year in the final.

Seeds

Draw and results

First round

denotes seed *

Second round

Third round

Quarter-finals

Semi-finals

Final

References

Women's British Open Squash Championships
British Open Squash Championships
Women's British Open Squash Championships
Squash competitions in London
Women's British Open Championships
British Open Championships
Women's British Open Squash Championships